Västra Ingelstad is a locality situated in Vellinge Municipality, Skåne County, Sweden with 721 inhabitants in 2010.

Västra Ingelstad Church is a medieval church with a richly decorated altarpiece, unparalleled in the province of Skåne.

References 

Populated places in Vellinge Municipality
Populated places in Skåne County